Wing of a European Roller (also known as Wing of a Blue Roller) is a nature study watercolor by Albrecht Dürer. Dürer painted it from a dead specimen in 1500 or 1512.

Description
The watercolor's dimensions are 19.6 x 20 centimeters. It is in the collection of the Albertina, Vienna. In 2013, the Wing of a European Roller was loaned with other Dürer works, to the National Gallery of Art, Washington.

References 

16th-century paintings
Watercolours by Albrecht Dürer
Birds in art
Collections of the Albertina, Vienna